Liébana is a comarca of Cantabria (Spain). It covers 575 square kilometres and is located in the far southwest of Cantabria, bordering Asturias, León and Palencia. It is made up of the municipalities of: Cabezón de Liébana, Camaleño, Cillorigo de Liébana, Pesaguero, Potes, Tresviso and Vega de Liébana.

Geography

Liébana is a closed mountainous comarca, constituted by four valleys (Valdebaró, Cereceda, Valdeprao and Cillorigo) that connect in Potes, the centre of the comarca. Its main rivers are the Deva, the Quiviesa and the Buyón. The steep-sided uplands are formed of Carboniferous limestone affected by karstic processes. Shale and sandstone can be found in the bottom of the valleys.

The considerable deepness of the valleys, with big differences in altitude and steep slopes creates a great wide variety of environments which allow for a multitude of vegetable species: beeches, holm oaks, cork oaks and other types of oaks (Quercus robur, Quercus Pyrenaica and Quercus lusitania), grazing pastures and cultivated crops. Its narrow relief makes it have a microclimate different from the rest of the region, affected by an Atlantic climate. So, while in the bottom of the valley of Liébana a Mediterranean climate can be enjoyed, it shifts progressively as we ascend to a humid Atlantic climate until subalpine conditions are reached in the high peaks of Picos de Europa. The average annual temperatures are 28°C maximum and 8°C minimum, with a lower precipitation rate than in other Cantabrian zones (800 mm annually versus 1,000 to 1,200 mm of average in the region).

Municipalities

The seven municipalities, with their areas and populations, are set out below:

Economy
The economy of the comarca of Liébana has shifted from the primary sector to the rural tourism boom, thanks to its landscapes and the appeal of the Picos de Europa National Park. Nevertheless, the development brought by tourism has affected the township of Potes, capital of the comarca almost exclusively, to the detriment of the rest of the villages of the valley. Thus, Potes in the late 20th century enjoyed population growth, the other settlements were undergoing a decrease in population. However since 2000 Potes has been declining in population, in line with the rest of the comarca.

History
At the end of the 14th century, King John I of Castile granted the lordship of Liébana to his cousin Don Juan Téllez of Castile, Lord of Aguilar de Campoo and son of the Infante Don Tello of Castile. Towards the second half of the 15th century, the possession of the lordship of Liébana was the cause of one of the frequent peerage wars of that time, and subsequently of a long lawsuit between the heirs of Don Juan Téllez of Castile (the Marquises of Aguilar de Campoo) and the successors of the second marriage of his wife Doña Leonor de la Vega (the Dukes of Infantado). In 1576 the courts passed sentence in favor of the House of Infantado.

Saint Beatus of Liébana (c. 730 – c. 800) settled in the region, where he died. He was a monk, theologian and geographer, remembered as the compiler of the Commentary on the Apocalypse, written in 776, which contains one of the earliest Christian world-maps.

See also
Santo Toribio de Liébana

Bibliography
Songbook of Liébana, Matilde Camus 1977

External links
 Walking routes in Liébana
 Liebana.net
Liébana and Picos de Europa
 Center of Studies of Liébana
 2006-2007 Liébanan Jubilee Year

References

Comarcas of Cantabria
Valleys of Cantabria
Green Spain
Picos de Europa